Thomas George Lomer (14 May 1904 – 3 May 1966) was an Australian rules footballer who played with St Kilda in the Victorian Football League (VFL).

Family
The son of Thomas Cox Lomer (1859-1937), and Mary Jane Lomer (1861-1939), née Gray, Thomas George Lomer was born at Port Frederick, Devonport, Tasmania on 14 May 1904.

He married Margaret Hutchinson Dodd (1909-1989) at St Kilda on 27 September 1933.

Football

Notes

References

External links 

1904 births
1966 deaths
Australian rules footballers from Tasmania
St Kilda Football Club players
Latrobe Football Club players